The 1987 Boston Red Sox season was the 87th season in the franchise's Major League Baseball history. The Red Sox finished fifth in the American League East with a record of 78 wins and 84 losses, 20 games behind the Detroit Tigers.

Regular season

Highlights
 June 29, 1987: Wade Boggs had a grand slam, a triple, and seven RBIs in a game against the Baltimore Orioles.

Season standings

Record vs. opponents

Notable transactions
 July 23, 1987: Bill Buckner was released by the Red Sox.
 August 21, 1987: Glenn Hoffman was traded by the Red Sox to the Los Angeles Dodgers for a player to be named later (minor league player Billy Bartels).
 September 1, 1987: Don Baylor was traded by the Red Sox to the Minnesota Twins for a player to be named later (minor league player Enrique Rios).
 September 1, 1987: Dave Henderson was traded by the Red Sox to the San Francisco Giants for a player to be named later (Randy Kutcher).

Opening Day lineup

Source:

Alumni game
On May 23, the Red Sox held an old-timers game, before a scheduled home game with the Chicago White Sox. The game was themed to celebrate the 75th anniversary of Fenway Park. The Red Sox team included Jim Lonborg, Jimmy Piersall, Luis Tiant, and Ted Williams; they were defeated by a team of other MLB alumni, including Cleveland Indians Hall of Fame inductee Bob Feller, Detroit Tigers pitcher Mark Fidrych, and slugger Dick Allen.

Roster

Statistical leaders 

Source:

Batting 

Source:

Pitching 

Source:

Awards and honors
Awards
Wade Boggs, Silver Slugger Award (3B), AL Player of the Month (June)
Roger Clemens, American League Cy Young Award
Dwight Evans, Silver Slugger Award (OF), AL Player of the Month (August)

Accomplishments
Wade Boggs, American League Batting Champion, .363
Wade Boggs, Major League Baseball Leader, On-base percentage (.461)
Roger Clemens, American League Leader, Complete Games (18)
Roger Clemens, American League Leader, Shutouts (7)
Roger Clemens, American League Leader, Wins (20)

All-Star Game
Wade Boggs, third base, starter
Dwight Evans, outfield, reserve
Bruce Hurst, pitcher, reserve

Farm system 

Source:

References

External links
 1987 Boston Red Sox team page at Baseball Reference
 1987 Boston Red Sox season at baseball-almanac.com

Boston Red Sox seasons
Boston Red Sox
Boston Red Sox
Red Sox